Gun (lit. "big fish"), also known as Count of Chong, was a figure in Chinese mythology, sometimes noted as the father of Yu the Great, the founder of the Xia dynasty. Gun was appointed to the task of controlling the Great Flood by Emperor Yao on the advice of the Four Mountains. Gun used dykes to try to stop the flooding but the dykes collapsed, killing many people.

In mythology 
According to Sima Qian's Records of the Grand Historian, Gun's father was Zhuanxu, grandfather was Changyi, and great-grandfather was the Yellow Emperor, Changyi & Gun being mere officials, not emperors. Book of Han, quoting Lord Yu Imperial Lineage, stated that Gun was a five-generation-descendant of Zhuanxu. The Classic of Mountains and Seas stated that Gun (also known as "White Horse" Báimǎ) was the son of Luómíng (駱明), who in turn was the son of the Yellow Emperor. Also in many versions of the mythology, Gun appears as a demi-god. In legends, he even discovered some of the secrets of the gods.

In order to make dykes that would ward off floods, he stole Xirang (self-renewing soil) from the gods. After the dykes were finished, when the water levels rose, the magical earth of the dyke also rose to keep the water out. It worked very well at first, but when the dykes rose too high (in the legend, they rose to nine rèn 仞 (an ancient Chinese measure of between 1 and 3 meters)), they collapsed, resulting in the death of many people in the subsequent flood. Some legends say that Gun was executed by Emperor Shun on Feather Mountain (at the present day Lianyungang, Jiangsu) with the sword of Wu, other sources however state that he committed suicide by jumping into an abyss, transformed into an animal and became the god of the abyss. Before his death he told his son, Yu the Great, to finish his job.

Classic of Mountains and Seas also records that Gun has family ties to Huantou "Happy Head", also known as Huandou "Happy Helmet", one of the Four Criminals. In turn, Zhang Shoujie's Correct Meanings of Records of the Grand Historian (史記正義) identifies Gun with the Taowu ("Block-Stump"), another of those four.

Etymology
According to Schuessler (2009), 鯀 (standard Chinese gǔn < Old Chinese *kwə̂nʔ) is the same word as 鮌 (gǔn < OC *kwə̂nʔ) and 鯤 (kūn < OC *kûn), the latter being a mythical giant fish mentioned in Zhuangzi.

In his treatise "Commentaries on a miscellany of marine creatures in Fujian" ( Mǐnzhōng hǎicuò shū), Ming scholar Tu Benjun states that the  mǎjiāo "Chinese mackerel, Chinese seerfish" is also called  zhānggǔn. Wolfram Eberhard (1968) suggests that Chinese texts' descriptions of 鯀 Gǔn as a "naked one" and "dark fish" fit the eel.

See also
Zhurong
Four Evildoers

Note

References

24th-century BC people
Executed Chinese people
People executed by China by decapitation
Four Evildoers